The women's freestyle 75 kilograms is a competition featured at the 1998 World Wrestling Championships, and was held in Poznań, Poland from 8 to 10 October 1998.

Results

Round 1

Round 2

Round 3

Round 4

Finals

References

External links
Results

Women's freestyle 75 kg